The Parliamentary Under-Secretary of State for Sport, Tourism and Civil Society is a junior position in the Department for Digital, Culture, Media and Sport in the British government. It is currently held by Stuart Andrew who took the office on 27 October 2022. The position was created by the Second May ministry after the 2017 general election. The role is a successor of the Minister for Tourism and Heritage which was abolished in 2012 after the 2012 Summer Olympics in London. The position gained the portfolio of the former Minister for Sport and Civil Society in 2020.

Responsibilities 
The minister has responsibility of the following policy areas:

 Arts
 Culture
 Heritage
 Public libraries
 Museums
 National Archives
 Tourism

List of Parliamentary Under-Secretaries of State for Arts, Heritage and Tourism 

Office formed out of Minister for Sport and Civil Society and Minister for Tourism and Heritage

References 

Arts, Heritage and Tourism
Ministerial offices in the United Kingdom
2015 establishments in the United Kingdom
Department for Digital, Culture, Media and Sport
Tourism in the United Kingdom
Tourism ministers
English Heritage